The prime minister of Saint Kitts and Nevis is the head of government of the Federation of Saint Christopher and Nevis. The current Prime Minister is Terrance Drew since 6th August 2022.

Chief Ministers (1960–1967)

Elizabeth II (1960–1967)

Premiers (1967–1983)

Elizabeth II (1967–1983)

Prime Ministers (1983–present)

Elizabeth II (1983–2022)

Charles III (2022-present)

References

See also
Governor-General of Saint Kitts and Nevis
Deputy Prime Minister of Saint Kitts and Nevis
Premier of Nevis

Saint Kitts and Nevis, Prime Ministers
 
Prime Minister
1983 establishments in Saint Kitts and Nevis
Prime ministers